The 1888 Michigan gubernatorial election was held on November 6, 1888. Republican nominee Cyrus G. Luce defeated Fusion candidate Wellington R. Burt with 49.20% of the vote.

General election

Candidates
Major party candidates
Cyrus G. Luce, Republican
Wellington R. Burt, Democratic
Other candidates
Amherst B. Cheney, Prohibition
William Mills, Union Labor

Results

References

Notes

1888
Michigan
Gubernatorial
November 1888 events